Clypeaster amplificatus is a species of sea urchins of the Family Clypeasteridae. Their armour is covered with spines. Clypeaster amplificatus was first scientifically described in 1922 by Koehler.

See also 

 Cionobrissus revinctus
 Clypeaster aloysioi
 Clypeaster annandalei

References 

Animals described in 1922
Clypeaster